Kadro was an influential leftist magazine published in Turkey between January 1932 and December 1934. The title of Kadro translates from Turkish as "cadre" (referring to the "cadre" of intellectuals who were to be the vanguard of the permanent Turkish revolution).

History and profile
Kadro was first published in January 1932. The founders were leading Turkish journalists and authors: Yakup Kadri Karaosmanoğlu, Şevket Süreyya Aydemir and Vedat Nedim Tör. Of them Karaosmanoğlu was also the license holder who asked for permission from Mustafa Kemal Atatürk, President of Turkey, to publish a magazine. Regular contributors of Kadro included Burhan Asaf Belge, İsmail Hüsrev Tökin and Mehmet Şevki Yazman.

Kadro increased its criticism over the bureaucrats of the ruling party, Republican People's Party, which led to its closure in 1934.

Ideology
Kadro believed that a Turkish revolution would occur in two stages: the battle to achieve political sovereignty, achieved in the Turkish War of Independence, and an ongoing battle to liberate the economy and society from imperialist influence. To this end, the Kadro theorists borrowed heavily from Marxist theory, particularly elements of Soviet central planning, and also to a limited extent from south-west European nationalism. Importantly, the Kadro theorists never accepted either of these ideologies, believing that they were creating a third (non-capitalist, non-socialist) development theory that would be essentially Turkish. 

The theorists advocated absolute state control of the economy (statism , a key element of Kemalist ideology), believing that Turkey could overcome the problem of class conflict if the state never developed a middle and upper class. If the state was in charge of development, class conflict would not arise, as capital would be in the hands of the state, not specific classes.

Kadro was important as it sought to provide Kemalist Turkey with a solid theoretical underpinning. Although Kadro policies were never absolutely adapted, Turkey did pursue a state-centered development strategy. The magazine Kadro led to the creation of a so called Kadro movement consistent of left-wing political theorists and its journalists took part in the nightly political debates organized by Atatürk. 

Although it claimed to be supportive of the government, the magazine was shut down in 1934: economically liberal figures in the government (like Celal Bayar) worked against the Kadro theories, which they found far too leftist.

See also
Statism

References

Further reading
Harris, George. "The Communists and the Kadro: Shaping Ideology in Atatürk's Turkey". Istanbul: Isis, 2002.
Turkes, Mustafa. "A Patriotic Leftist Development-Strategy Proposal in Turkey in the 1930s: The Case of the Kadro (Cadre) Movement", International Journal of Middle East Studies, 2001, 33: 91-114.

External links
 
 Online digitized version
 

1932 establishments in Turkey
1934 disestablishments in Turkey
Defunct political magazines published in Turkey
Kemalism
Left-wing politics
Magazines established in 1932
Magazines disestablished in 1934
Magazines published in Ankara
Turkish-language magazines